Thomas Joseph Savage was an Anglican bishop in the third quarter of the 20th century.

Born on 5 February 1900, and educated at Highgate and Peterhouse, he was ordained in 1927. Following a curacy at St John’s, Waterloo Road he worked at the South African Church Railway Mission and was then a  Toc H padre. After a spell as rector of Springs, Transvaal he was vicar of Leominster then Tait Missioner for the Diocese of Canterbury. In 1955 he was appointed dean of Cape Town and three years later bishop of Zululand, a post he held to his death on 22 October 1966.

Styles and titles 

 Mr Thomas Savage ( -1927)
 The Revd Thomas Savage (1927 - 1955)
 The Very Revd Thomas Savage (1955 - 1958)
 The Rt Revd Thomas Savage (1958 - 1966)

Notes 

1900 births
People educated at Highgate School
Alumni of Peterhouse, Cambridge
Deans of Cape Town
Anglican bishops of Zululand
20th-century Anglican Church of Southern Africa bishops
1966 deaths